"King and Queen" is the winner's single by the second New Zealand series winner of The X Factor, Beau Monga. It was released digitally on 18 May 2015 and on CD single in June, as the lead single from his self-titled debut album. "King and Queen" was written solely by Beau Monga and produced by Soko Lapez. It debuted at number two on the Official New Zealand Music Chart and number one on the New Zealand Artist chart.

Background and release

"King and Queen" was written solely by Beau Monga. The single was released for digital download on the evening of The X Factor grand final on 18 May, with the CD single release in June.

Reception
"King and Queen" debuted at number two on the New Zealand Singles Chart on 22 May 2015.

Live performances

Monga performed "King and Queen" live for the first time during The X Factor grand final show on 18 May. Monga performed the song again later in the show after he was announced as the winner. On 19 May  2015, he appeared on The Paul Henry Show for an interview, and sang "King and Queen" afterward.

Track listing
CD single / digital download 
"King and Queen" – 3:36

Release history

Chart positions

References

2015 songs
Beau Monga songs